This list shows the IUCN Red List status of the mammal species occurring in Switzerland. Nine of them are near threatened, and most are least concern.
The following tags are used to highlight each species' status as assessed on the respective Red List published by the International Union for Conservation of Nature:

Order: Rodentia (rodents) 

Rodents make up the largest order of mammals, with over 40% of mammalian species. They have two incisors in the upper and lower jaw which grow continually and must be kept short by gnawing.
Suborder: Castorimorpha
Family: Castoridae
Subfamily: Castorinae
Tribe: Castorini
Genus: Castor
 Eurasian beaver, C. fiber  reintroduced
Suborder: Sciurognathi
Family: Sciuridae (squirrels)
Subfamily: Sciurinae
Tribe: Sciurini
Genus: Sciurus
 Red squirrel, S. vulgaris 
Subfamily: Xerinae
Tribe: Marmotini
Genus: Marmota
 Alpine marmot, M. marmota 
Family: Gliridae (dormice)
Subfamily: Leithiinae
Genus: Dryomys
 Forest dormouse, D. nitedula 
Genus: Eliomys
 Garden dormouse, E. quercinus 
Genus: Muscardinus
 Hazel dormouse, M. avellanarius 
Subfamily: Glirinae
Genus: Glis
 European edible dormouse, G. glis 
Family: Cricetidae
Subfamily: Arvicolinae
Genus: Arvicola
 European water vole, A. amphibius 
Genus: Chionomys
 European snow vole, C. nivalis 
Genus: Clethrionomys
 Bank vole, C. glareolus 
Genus: Microtus
 Field vole, M. agrestis 
 Common vole, M. arvalis 
 Alpine pine vole, M. multiplex 
 European pine vole, M. subterraneus 
Subfamily: Cricetinae
Genus: Cricetus
European hamster, C. cricetus  extirpated
Family: Muridae (mice, rats, voles, gerbils, hamsters)
Subfamily: Murinae
Genus: Mus
House mouse, M. musculus 
Genus: Apodemus
 Alpine field mouse, A. alpicola 
 Yellow-necked mouse, A. flavicollis 
 Wood mouse, A. sylvaticus 
Genus: Micromys
 Eurasian harvest mouse, M. minutus

Order: Lagomorpha (lagomorphs) 

The lagomorphs comprise two families, Leporidae (hares and rabbits), and Ochotonidae (pikas). Though they can resemble rodents, and were classified as a superfamily in that order until the early 20th century, they have since been considered a separate order. They differ from rodents in a number of physical characteristics, such as having four incisors in the upper jaw rather than two.

Family: Leporidae (rabbits, hares)
Genus: Lepus
European hare, L. europaeus 
Mountain hare, L. timidus 
Genus: Oryctolagus
European rabbit, O. cuniculus  introduced

Order: Eulipotyphla (shrews, hedgehogs and moles) 

Eulipotyphlans are insectivorous mammals. Shrews and solenodons resemble mice, hedgehogs carry spines, gymnures look more like large rats, while moles are stout-bodied burrowers.
Family: Erinaceidae (hedgehogs)
Subfamily: Erinaceinae
Genus: Erinaceus
 West European hedgehog, E. europaeus 
Family: Soricidae (shrews)
Subfamily: Crocidurinae
Genus: Crocidura
 Bicolored shrew, C. leucodon 
 Greater white-toothed shrew, C. russula 
Lesser white-toothed shrew, C. suaveolens 
Subfamily: Soricinae
Tribe: Nectogalini
Genus: Neomys
 Mediterranean water shrew, N. anomalus 
 Eurasian water shrew, N. fodiens 
Tribe: Soricini
Genus: Sorex
 Alpine shrew, S. alpinus 
 Common shrew, S. araneus 
 Crowned shrew, S. coronatus 
 Eurasian pygmy shrew, S. minutus 
Family: Talpidae (moles)
Subfamily: Talpinae
Tribe: Talpini
Genus: Talpa
 Mediterranean mole, T. caeca 
 European mole, T. europaea

Order: Chiroptera (bats) 

The bats' most distinguishing feature is that their forelimbs are developed as wings, making them the only mammals capable of flight. Bat species account for about 20% of all mammals.
Family: Vespertilionidae
Subfamily: Myotinae
Genus: Myotis
 Bechstein's bat, M. bechsteini <ref>{{cite iucn |title=Myotis bechsteinii' |author=Paunović, M. |year=2019 |page=e.T14123A22053752}}</ref>
 Greater mouse-eared bat, M. myotis 
 Lesser mouse-eared bat, M. blythii 
 Brandt's bat, M. brandti 
 Cryptic myotis, M. crypticus 
 Daubenton's bat, M. daubentonii 
 Geoffroy's bat, M. emarginatus 
 Natterer's bat, M. nattereri 
Subfamily: Vespertilioninae
Genus: Barbastella Barbastelle, B. barbastellus 
Genus: Eptesicus Northern bat, E. nilssoni 
Genus: Nyctalus Greater noctule bat, N. lasiopterus 
 Lesser noctule, N. leisleri 
 Common noctule, N. noctula 
Genus: Pipistrellus Nathusius' pipistrelle, P. nathusii 
Genus: PlecotusBrown long-eared bat, P. auritus 
Grey long-eared bat, P. austriacus 
Subfamily: Miniopterinae
Genus: MiniopterusCommon bent-wing bat, M. schreibersii 
Family: Molossidae
Genus: Tadarida European free-tailed bat, T. teniotis 
Family: Rhinolophidae
Subfamily: Rhinolophinae
Genus: Rhinolophus Greater horseshoe bat, R. ferrumequinum 
 Lesser horseshoe bat, R. hipposideros 

 Order: Carnivora (carnivorans) 

There are over 260 species of carnivorans, the majority of which feed primarily on meat. They have a characteristic skull shape and dentition. 
Suborder: Feliformia
Family: Felidae (cats)
Subfamily: Felinae
Genus: Felis European wildcat, F. silvestris 
Genus: Lynx Eurasian lynx, L. lynx  reintroduced
Family: Viverridae
Subfamily: Viverrinae
Genus: Genetta Common genet, G. genetta  introduced, presence uncertain
Suborder: Caniformia
Family: Canidae
Genus: Canis Gray wolf, C. lupus 
 Italian wolf, C. l. italicus Eurasian wolf, C. l. lupusGenus: Vulpes Red fox, V. vulpes 
Family: Ursidae (bears)
Genus: Ursus Brown bear, U. arctos  presence uncertain
 Eurasian brown bear, U. a. arctos presence uncertain
Family: Mustelidae (mustelids)
Genus: Mustela Stoat, M. erminea 
European mink, M. lutreola  extirpated
 Least weasel, M. nivalis 
 European polecat, M. putorius 
Genus: Martes Beech marten, M. foina 
 European pine marten, M. martes 
Genus: Meles European badger, M. meles 
Genus: Lutra European otter, L. lutra  reintroduced

 Order: Artiodactyla (even-toed ungulates) 

The even-toed ungulates are ungulates whose weight is borne about equally by the third and fourth toes, rather than mostly or entirely by the third as in perissodactyls. There are about 220 artiodactyl species, including many that are of great economic importance to humans.
Family: Bovidae (cattle, antelope, sheep, goats)
Subfamily: Bovinae
Genus: BisonEuropean bison, B. bonasus  extirpated
Genus: BosAurochs, B. primigenius 
Subfamily: Caprinae
Genus: CapraAlpine ibex, C. ibex  reintroduced
Genus: RupicapraChamois, R. rupicapra 
Family: Cervidae (deer)
Subfamily: Cervinae
Genus: CervusRed deer, C. elaphus 
Genus: Dama European fallow deer, D. dama  introduced
Subfamily: Capreolinae
Genus: AlcesMoose, A. alces  extirpated
Genus: CapreolusRoe deer, C. capreolus }
Family: Suidae (pigs)
Subfamily: Suinae
Genus: SusWild boar, S. scrofa''

See also
 List of chordate orders
 Lists of mammals by region
 List of prehistoric mammals
 Mammal classification
 List of mammals described in the 2000s

References

External links 

Switzerland
Mammals
Mammals
Switzerland